Sisyphus was the king of Corinth, punished in Tartarus by being cursed to roll a huge boulder up a hill in Greek mythology.

Sisyphus may also refer to:

Places
 1866 Sisyphus, an Apollo asteroid

People
 Sisyphus of Pharsalus, a contemporary of Plato

Arts, entertainment, and media

Literature
 Sisyphus (dialogue), a dialogue between Socrates and Sisyphus of Pharsalus, attributed to Plato
 The Myth of Sisyphus, an essay by Albert Camus

Music
 Sisyphus (hip hop group), a musical collaboration formerly known as S / S / S featuring Serengeti, Son Lux, and Sufjan Stevens
 Sisyphus (album), their 2014 debut album
 Sisyphus, a 1971 album by Cold Blood
 Stone Of Sisyphus, an album by the American rock band Chicago
 "Sysyphus", an avant-garde piece of music from the Pink Floyd album Ummagumma
 "Sisyphus", a song by American singer-songwriter Andrew Bird from his album My Finest Work Yet

Other arts, entertainment, and media
 Sisyphus (Titian), a 1548–1549 painting by Titian
 Sisyphus (film), a 1974 animated short film by Marcell Jankovics
 Sisyphus: The Myth, a 2021 South Korean television series
 Sisyphus Prime, a boss in the game Ultrakill

Other uses
 Sisyphus (beetle), a genus of dung beetles
 Český klub skeptiků Sisyfos, Czech Skeptics' Club
 Sisyphus effect, a method of cooling below temperatures predicted by Doppler Cooling in Atomic Physics